The 10th Regiment of Foot (also known as the 10th Regiment of Foot of Działyński and the Radzyński Regiment) was a Polish military unit. Initially formed in 1775 under the name of Regiment of Foot of the Land of Rydzyna, it was stationed in Rydzyna as a private unit of Col. Ignacy Działyński. Relocated to Warsaw, in 1789 it received the ordinal number of 11, and then 10 in 1794. A part of garrison of the city of Warsaw, it used to be stationed in the Ujazdów Castle. It took part in the Warsaw Uprising (1794) and formed the core of the Polish forces taking part in the fights. Among other battles it took part in fights at Swisłocz, Zelwa, Izabelin, Piaski, Granne, Krzemień, Biała, Chełm, Kurów, Gołków, the defence of Praga, defence of Wola and the battle of Maciejowice.

Among the notable commanders of the regiment were:
 August Sułkowski (1775–1786)
 Aleksander Mycielski (1786–1788)
 Ignacy Działyński (1788–1789)
 Karol de Falckenhayn
 Filip Hauman
 Józef Zeydlitz

References 

Infantry regiments of Poland
Military units and formations established in 1775
1775 establishments in Poland
1775 establishments in the Polish–Lithuanian Commonwealth